Léonie Island is the largest and westernmost of the Léonie Islands,  in diameter and  high, lying in the entrance to Ryder Bay along the southeast side of Adelaide Island, Antarctica. It was discovered and named by the French Antarctic Expedition, 1908–10, under Jean-Baptiste Charcot.

See also 
 List of Antarctic and sub-Antarctic islands

References

Islands of Adelaide Island